Furqan Qureshi is a Pakistani television actor known for his roles in Urdu television serials such as Khuda Mera Bhi Hai, Ishq Tamasha, Meray Paas Tum Ho and Raqs-e-Bismil.

Career
Qureshi made his television debut with a minor role in TV One's Shaista Shaista, written by Mohammad Ahmed. He first  received recognition for his role of Agha in Youth series Dreamers, created and directed by Azfar Ali. He then played supporting characters in several television serials such as Goya, Zinda Dargor and Muqaddas.

Qureshi first played the lead role in Hum Sitaray's 100 Din Ki Kahani for which he also received his first nomination, Hum Awards for Best Actor Soap. He appeared in several serials of ARY Zindagi such as Inteqam, Badbakht and Khushaal Susral. He received critical praise by portraying an intersex in Sana Shahnawaz's Khuda Mera Bhi Hai. Furthermore, he recently appeared in television serials such as Ishq Tamasha, Meray Paas Tum Ho, and Raqs-e-Bismil.

Filmography

Television drama

Telefilm

Web series

References

Living people
1988 births
Pakistani male actors